Little Tokyo/Arts District station is an under construction underground light rail station on the Los Angeles Metro Rail system which will replace a former at-grade station with the same name. The former station was located on the east side of Alameda Street, between 1st Street and Temple Street, on the edge of Little Tokyo and the Arts District in Downtown Los Angeles. The former station opened in 2009 as part of the Gold Line Eastside Extension, and was served by the L Line. The at-grade station closed in October 2020, and the new underground station on the south side of 1st Street between Central Avenue and Alameda Street is scheduled to open in early 2023. A bus bridge currently operates along the line until the replacement is completed.

History 

This area was once a key area for trains in downtown. James M. Davies, for whom the large tract was named, subdivided the area in 1891. Several railroad lines from different companies connected through this site.  Davies great-nephew, Robert Davies Volk, was the owner of the lots at 1st and Alameda streets with brick buildings shaped to fit the long-gone rail lines. The structures had played an important role in the cultural life of the Little Tokyo neighborhood for decades before the site was cleared for the future station. Los Angeles Railway P Line yellow streetcars operated on the surface of 1st Street until 1963, including a call at Alameda.

An at-grade light rail station opened at this location on November 15, 2009, as part of the Gold Line Eastside Extension. The station was closed on October 24, 2020.

The Regional Connector is a light rail tunnel through Downtown Los Angeles that will connect the current Metro Rail A, E, and L Lines. Under current plans, the station will be served by both the restructured A Line, connecting Long Beach and the San Gabriel Valley, and the restructured E Line, connecting Santa Monica and East Los Angeles. The new station was originally referred to as 1st St/Central in planning documents, but was ultimately assigned the same name as the existing station. The decision to rebuild the station underground was driven in part by traffic concerns on Alameda and 1st Street caused by at-grade trains. The Regional Connector is scheduled to open in 2023.

Preliminary work for the underground station required the demolition of two modest single-story brick store buildings with one of the structures dating back to at least 1898. A series of new developments are being built on the blocks surrounding the station. The above-ground station was briefly closed in early 2016 due to the relocation of tracks for the Regional Connector project. The above-ground station was again closed for the final time on October 24, 2020, and the underground station is planned to open 22 months later. Until the replacement station is completed, a bus bridge will operate between Union Station and Pico/Aliso station for those riders traveling along the L Line.

Beyond the Regional Connector opening, the West Santa Ana Branch Transit Corridor is planned to terminate downtown via a new light rail tunnel to Union Station. The line will feature a new transfer at Little Tokyo/Arts District station, which requires connecting the two subways with new infrastructure.

Service

Station layout

Hours and frequency

Connections 
When the station opens, the following connections are expected to be available:
 Los Angeles Metro Bus: , 
 LADOT DASH: A

Notable places nearby 
The station is within walking distance of the following notable places:
 Arts District
 Japanese American National Museum
 Little Tokyo
 The Geffen Contemporary at MOCA
 Southern California Institute of Architecture

References

External links 

Official Eastside Extension page LACMTA

Future Los Angeles Metro Rail stations
L Line (Los Angeles Metro)
Little Tokyo, Los Angeles
Railway stations in the United States opened in 2009
Railway stations in Los Angeles
Buildings and structures in Downtown Los Angeles
2009 establishments in California
Railway stations scheduled to open in 2023